Dame Kristin Ann Scott Thomas  (born 24 May 1960) is a British actress who also holds French citizenship. A five-time BAFTA Award and Olivier Award nominee, she won the BAFTA Award for Best Actress in a Supporting Role for Four Weddings and a Funeral (1994) and the Olivier Award for Best Actress in 2008 for the Royal Court revival of The Seagull. She was nominated for the Academy Award for Best Actress in The English Patient (1996).

Scott Thomas made her film debut in Under the Cherry Moon (1986), and won the Evening Standard Film Award for Most Promising Newcomer for A Handful of Dust (1988). Her work includes Bitter Moon (1992), Mission: Impossible (1996), The Horse Whisperer (1998), Gosford Park (2001), The Valet (2006), and Tell No One (2007). She won the European Film Award for Best Actress for Philippe Claudel's I've Loved You So Long (2008). Her other films include Leaving (2009), Love Crime (2010), Sarah's Key (2010), Nowhere Boy (2010), The Woman in the Fifth (2011), Only God Forgives (2013), Darkest Hour (2017), and Tomb Raider (2018).

She was appointed Officer of the Order of the British Empire (OBE) in the 2003 Birthday Honours and Dame Commander of the Order of the British Empire (DBE) in the 2015 New Year Honours for services to drama. She was named a Chevalier of the Légion d'honneur by the French government in 2005.

Early life
Scott Thomas was born in Redruth, Cornwall. Her mother, Deborah (née Hurlbatt), was brought up in Hong Kong and Africa, and studied drama before marrying Kristin's father, Lieutenant Commander Simon Scott Thomas, a pilot in the Royal Navy's Fleet Air Arm who died in a flying accident when Kristin was aged five.  She is the elder sister of Serena Scott Thomas, the niece of Admiral Sir Richard Thomas (a former Black Rod), the granddaughter of William Scott Thomas (who commanded  during World War II) and the great-great-niece of the polar explorer Captain Robert Falcon Scott.

The childhood home of Scott Thomas was in Trent, near Sherborne, Dorset, England. Her mother remarried to another Royal Navy pilot, Lieutenant Commander Simon Idiens (of Simon's Sircus aerobatic team flying Sea Vixens), who also died in a flying accident, whilst flying a Phantom FG1 from RNAS Yeovilton off the North coast of Cornwall in January 1972. Scott Thomas was educated at Cheltenham Ladies' College and St Antony's Leweston in Sherborne, Dorset, both independent schools.

On leaving school in 1978, she moved to Hampstead, London, and worked in a department store. She began training to become a drama teacher at the Central School of Speech and Drama, enrolling on a BEd in Speech and Drama. During her time at the school, she requested to switch degree courses to acting but was refused. After a year at Central, speaking French fluently, she decided to move to Paris to work as an au pair and studied acting at the École Nationale supérieure des arts et techniques du théâtre (ENSATT). When she was 25, she was cast as Mary Sharon in the film Under the Cherry Moon (1986).

Career

Kristin Scott Thomas' acting career garnered early attention when she was cast as Mary Sharon in Under the Cherry Moon, released in 1986, the first but widely panned film directed by and starring the already well-known musical artist, Prince. Her breakthrough role was playing Brenda Last in an adaptation of Evelyn Waugh's A Handful of Dust (1988), winning her  the Evening Standard British Film Award for the most promising newcomer. This was followed by roles opposite Hugh Grant in Bitter Moon and Four Weddings and a Funeral where she won a BAFTA for Best Supporting Actress.

In 1994, she starred in the Romanian–French film An Unforgettable Summer, in which she played Marie-Thérèse Von Debretsy. Rather than learn Romanian for the part, she read her lines phonetically. She had all the lines translated into French, which she speaks fluently, so she knew what she was saying. In an interview for Gloucester Citizen on 22 March 2015, she cited An Unforgettable Summer as one of the films that she is most proud of alongside The English Patient and Only God Forgives.

1996 saw the release of the film with her most famous role as Katharine Clifton, The English Patient, which gained her Golden Globe and Oscar nominations as well as critical acclaim. This was followed by a brief period working in Hollywood on films such as The Horse Whisperer with Robert Redford and Random Hearts with Harrison Ford. However, growing disillusioned with Hollywood, she took a year off to give birth to her third child.

She returned to the stage in 2003 when she played the title role in a French theatre production of Racine's Bérénice, and appeared on-screen as Lady Sylvia McCordle in Robert Altman's Gosford Park. This started a critically acclaimed second career on stage, in which she has received four nominations for a Laurence Olivier Award for Best Actress, including one win, for her performance of Arkadina in a London West End production of Anton Chekhov's The Seagull. She reprised the role in New York in September 2008. In summer 2014, Scott Thomas returned to London's West End to star as Emma in Harold Pinter's Betrayal at the Comedy Theatre. The revival was directed by Ian Rickson. Her husband was played by Ben Miles and the love triangle was completed by Douglas Henshall. In January 2013, she starred in another Pinter play, Old Times, again directed by Ian Rickson. In 2014, she appeared at The Old Vic in the title role of Sophocles's Electra.

Scott Thomas has also acted in French films. In 2006, she played the role of Hélène, in French, in Ne le dis à personne (Tell No One), by French director Guillaume Canet. In 2008, Scott Thomas received many accolades for her performance in Il y a longtemps que je t'aime (I've Loved You So Long), including BAFTA and Golden Globe nominations for Best Actress. In 2009 she played the role of a wife who leaves her husband for another man in Leaving.

In Sarah's Key (2010) – the story of the Vel' d'Hiv Roundup – Scott Thomas starred as an American journalist in Paris who discovers that the flat her husband is renovating for them was once the home of an evicted Jewish family. Other roles include Elizabeth Boleyn, Countess of Wiltshire and Ormond, mother of Henry VIII's second wife Anne, in The Other Boleyn Girl (2008), the role of a fashion magazine creator and editor in the film Confessions of a Shopaholic (2009), and as a love interest of George Duroy (played by Robert Pattinson) in the 2012 film Bel Ami, based on the 1885 Maupassant novel.

She was also seen in The Woman in the Fifth (2011), a film adaption of Douglas Kennedy's novel of the same name, Lasse Hallström's Salmon Fishing in the Yemen (2011), Ralph Fiennes's The Invisible Woman (2013), Philippe Claudel's Before the Winter Chill (2013), and in Nicolas Winding Refn's Only God Forgives, which premiered at the 2013 Cannes Film Festival. In 2014, she voiced the narration of Kay Summersby, General Eisenhower's driver, in the documentary series D-Day Sacrifice. She appeared in Israel Horovitz's My Old Lady (2014) and Suite Française, the 2015 film adaptation of Irène Némirovsky's World War II novel directed by Saul Dibb.

In 2017 she was nominated for the BAFTA Award for Best Actress in a Supporting Role at the 71st British Academy Film Awards for portraying Clementine Churchill in Joe Wright's Darkest Hour. In May 2017, it was reported that Scott Thomas had signed on to star as BMW heiress Susanne Klatten in the thriller Paramour, directed by Alexandra-Therese Keining.

In 2020, Scott Thomas played Mrs. Danvers in director Ben Wheatley's adaptation of Daphne du Maurier's Gothic romance Rebecca, with Armie Hammer and Lily James. Also that year, she appeared in the BBC television remake of Alan Bennett's monologue series, Talking Heads, playing the role of Celia in the episode "Hand of God".

In June 2022, Thomas began filming her directorial debut My Mother's Wedding, starring Scarlett Johansson, Sienna Miller, Emily Beecham and Freida Pinto starring.

Personal life
Scott Thomas is a Francophile.  She married and  divorced François Olivennes, a French gynaecologist, with whom she has three children: Hannah (1988), Joseph (1991) and George (2000). Scott Thomas has lived in France since she was 19, brought up her three children in Paris, and sometimes considers herself more French than British. On The Graham Norton Show on BBC1 on 2 December 2022, Scott Thomas said she now lives in London.

Roman Polanski
In 2009, Scott Thomas signed a petition in support of film director Roman Polanski, calling for his release after Polanski was arrested in Switzerland in relation to his 1977 sexual abuse case.

Filmography

As director

Television

Theatre
 La Lune déclinante sur 4 ou 5 personnes qui dansent (1983, Festival de Semur en Auxois)
 Terre étrangère (1984, Théâtre Nanterre-Amandiers)
 Naïves Hirondelles (1984, Festival d'Avignon)
 Yes, peut-être (1985, in a field in Burgundy)
 Bérénice  (2001, Festival de Perpignan and Festival d'Avignon + national tour)
 Three Sisters (2003, Playhouse Theatre, London) ... Masha
 As You Desire Me (2005–06, Playhouse Theatre, London)  ... Elma
 The Seagull (2007, Royal Court Theatre, London)  ... Arkadina
 The Seagull (2008, Walter Kerr Theatre, New York)  ... Arkadina
 Harold Pinter's Betrayal (2011, Comedy Theatre, London) ... Emma
 Harold Pinter's Old Times (2013, Harold Pinter Theatre London) ... Kate/Anna
 Sophocles' Electra (2014, The Old Vic, London) ... Electra
 Peter Morgan's The Audience (2015, Apollo Theatre, London) ... Queen Elizabeth II

Olivier Awards

Honours
National
  Dame Commander of the Order of the British Empire (CBE, 31/12/2014 −OBE, 14/06/2003−).
Foreigns
  Knight of the National Order of the Legion of Honour (French Republic, 27/05/2005).

References

External links

 
 
 Ryan Gilbey, "The three stages of Kristin", interview,  The Guardian, 27 July 2007
 Louise France, "I'm 47. Unlike most actresses I don't lie about my age" Interview, The Guardian, 3 February 2008
 Betrayal, "Comedy Theatre Review",  The Telegraph, 17 June 2011
 Betrayal – Review, "Comedy Theatre London",  The Guardian, 17 June 2011
 First Night: Betrayal, "Comedy Theatre London",  The Independent', 17 June 2011
 My Grandparents' War: Kristin Scott Thomas, PBS'', May 17, 2022

1960 births
Living people
People from Redruth
People educated at Cheltenham Ladies' College
People from West Dorset District
20th-century English actresses
21st-century English actresses
Actresses awarded damehoods
Best Supporting Actress BAFTA Award winners
English expatriates in France
English film actresses
English stage actresses
English television actresses
European Film Award for Best Actress winners
Best Actress Lumières Award winners
Laurence Olivier Award winners
Outstanding Performance by a Cast in a Motion Picture Screen Actors Guild Award winners
Chevaliers of the Légion d'honneur
Dames Commander of the Order of the British Empire
People educated at Leweston School
Actresses from Cornwall
Actresses from Dorset
Audiobook narrators